The Museo del Corallo is a small private museum of coral jewellery in Naples, in Campania in southern Italy. It also holds some cameos and jewellery in ivory and tortoiseshell.  The works date from 1805 to 1950.

References 

Museums in Naples
Decorative arts museums in Italy
Jewellery museums